K-96 is a  state highway in central and southern Kansas.  Its western terminus is at the Colorado state line east of Towner, Colorado, where it continues as Colorado State Highway 96; its eastern terminus since 1999 is at U.S. Route 54/U.S. Route 400 in eastern Wichita.  

The eastern terminus was once at the Missouri state line, where the road continued as Route 96.  With the construction of US-400, K-96 was either concurrent with or bypassed by this road, and the road was decommissioned east of the current eastern terminus.  It was concurrent with U.S. Route 75 between Neodesha and Independence; and from Independence to Columbus, it was replaced with a realigned U.S. Route 160.  East of Alternate U.S. Route 69, it was turned over to Cherokee County.  In Missouri, Missouri 96 was terminated at Route 171, and the section between Missouri 171 and the Kansas state line was turned into Missouri Supplemental Route YY.

Route description

K-96 begins at the Colorado border in Greeley County, just east of Towner, Colorado. It heads east from this point, bypassing Horace to the south and crossing K-27 in Tribune. After crossing into Wichita County, it bypasses Selkirk to the south and meets K-25 in Leoti. It exits the city and travells roughly 8 miles, before running south of Marienthal. Here it intersects K-167 which connects to Marienthal. The highway then passes to the south of Modoc. K-96 reaches an intersection with US-83 in Scott City, followed by 24 miles (38.6 km) without another highway junction until K-23 at Dighton. 

After leaving Dighton, K-96 runs parallel to Walnut Creek, providing access to a George Washington Carver Monument and passing north of Beeler. It meets US-283 at Ness City. East of Ness City, K-96 runs through Bazine, Alexander, and Nekoma. It crosses US-183 at Rush Center, then bypasses Timken and runs through Albert and Heizer, gradually curving south to enter Great Bend.

In Great Bend, K-96 begins a concurrency with US-56 and K-156 as it crosses US-281. Just past Great Bend, K-156 leaves the overlap and heads northeast towards Ellsworth. K-96 and US-56 continues east and pass through Ellinwood and Chase before entering Lyons, where K-96 heads south with K-14, while US-56 continues east to McPherson and Interstate 135. K-96 and K-14 pass through Sterling and then turn east. K-14 and K-96 continue east until Nickerson, where it takes a more southeast course to bypass Hutchinson to the west and south. Through South Hutchinson, it has a brief quadruple concurrency with US-50 and K-61.

After splitting from US-50 and K-61, K-14 splits off to continue south.  K-96, heading southeast, provides access to, but does not directly serve, the Amish community of Yoder, while also going through Haven, Mount Hope, and Maize before entering Wichita. Throughout the Wichita metropolitan area, K-96 is a freeway. It concurs with Interstate 235 until that route ends at I-135, which it briefly follows southward until it splits off westbound onto its own freeway alignment. It continues eastbound until reaching the Jabara Airport, where it curves south. K-96 has an interchange (exit 53) with Interstate 35 (the Kansas Turnpike) before it ends at a trumpet interchange with US-54/400.

K-96 between Rush Center and Wichita is a part of the National Highway System.

Between Hutchinson and Wichita, K.S.A. 68-1044 designates K-96 as the State Fair Freeway (even though it is not a full freeway).

History
The Wichita-Hutchinson segment was straightened in the early 1970s, bypassing the towns of Maize and Mount Hope. In recent years, urban sprawl has brought the highway within city limits. Near the Amish community of Yoder, symbolic warning signs were placed on the road to warn drivers of the presence of carriages on the cross streets.

In a May 3, 1995 resolution, it was approved to move US-400 and K-96 to a new alignment between northwest of Fredonia and Neodesha, at that time the overlap with K-47 was removed. In a December 3, 1998 resolution, it was approved to truncate K-96 to end at US-400 by Wichita.

By 1996, the roadway had been widened to a four-lane expressway, and the symbolic warning signs near Yoder were not retained, as the signs did not comply with the Manual on Uniform Traffic Control Devices at the time. An interchange was built at Yoder Road; however, carriage traffic still crossed the roadway at-grade. In September 2000, a minivan heading home from the Kansas State Fair struck a carriage, killing the elderly occupants and their horses. The driver of the van could not see the carriage in time to avoid the accident, and was cleared of wrongdoing. The Kansas Department of Transportation received bad publicity in the wake of the accident because of the removal of the carriage warning signs. Despite the non-compliance with the MUTCD, new symbolic signs were installed along the roadway in 2001. The expressway segment of K-96 has been posted with a speed limit of  since the repeal of the national speed limit. This has also been a contention in accidents along this stretch, and some state legislators have attempted to write legislation to lower the speed limit along this stretch.

Future
KDOT plans to realign K-96 and K-14 between the north end of the super two, southeast of Nickerson, to the current alignment north of Sterling, which will bypass Nickerson and Sterling. The new $96.5 million highway will be a super two, built on a four-lane right-of-way. As of October 2017, there were only three tracts in Rice County and two tracts in Reno County that needed to be purchased. In 2019, KDOT announced that construction is expected to begin in April 2021, and to be completed by November 2022.  The project, part of a plan to build a diagonal corridor from Wichita northwest through Hutchinson and Great Bend to I-70 in Hays, was first considered by the state Legislature in 1986. Construction of the Reno and Rice county segment was originally going to begin January 2017 and be complete by June 2018, but was cancelled then due to lack of funding. On April 9, 2021, KDOT announced that the $81.7 million project will begin around April 26, 2021 and will be completed by June 16, 2023. The new section will be a super-two built to freeway standards, so it could be easily upgrade to four-lanes in the future. It will have a 70 mile-per-hour speed limit and no at-grade intersections. Diamond interchanges are going to be installed at 56th and Nickerson Boulevard in Reno County, as well as north of Sterling in Rice County. Bob Bergkamp Construction Company Incorporated of Wichita will be the primary contractor on the project.

Major junctions

References

External links
 Kansas Highway Maps: Current, Historic, KDOT
 Kennedy, Richie (2002). Kansas Highways Routelog (Kansas 96).

096
Transportation in Greeley County, Kansas
Transportation in Wichita County, Kansas
Transportation in Scott County, Kansas
Transportation in Lane County, Kansas
Transportation in Ness County, Kansas
Transportation in Rush County, Kansas
Transportation in Barton County, Kansas
Transportation in Rice County, Kansas
Transportation in Reno County, Kansas
Transportation in Sedgwick County, Kansas